Jan Hołub (born 21 March 1996) is a Polish swimmer. He competed in the men's 4 × 100 metre freestyle relay event at the 2018 European Aquatics Championships, winning the bronze medal.

References

External links
 

1996 births
Living people
Sportspeople from Wrocław
Polish male freestyle swimmers
European Aquatics Championships medalists in swimming
European Championships (multi-sport event) bronze medalists
21st-century Polish people